Diplolaena microcephala is a rounded shrub with elliptic leaves, distinctive stamens, variable flower colour and is endemic to Western Australia.

Description
The leaf upper surface is sparsely covered with large rusty coloured star-shaped hairs, the underside moderately covered with stiff, large rusty coloured star shaped hairs. The inner bracts narrowly  oblong to narrowing triangular, slightly longer than outer bracts. Flowering occurs sporadically throughout the year.

Taxonomy
Diplolaena microcephala was first formally described in 1845 by Friedrich Gottlieb Bartling and the description was published in Plantae Preissianae.

Distribution and habitat
Lesser diplolaena grows near the south coast of Western Australia from near Walpole, east to near Hopetoun and east of Esperance. It grows  in sand, gravelly soils and rocky loam near river banks and on granite hills.

References

Sapindales of Australia
Rosids of Western Australia
Garden plants of Australia
Zanthoxyloideae